The 1958–59 Northern Rugby Football League season was the 64th season of rugby league football. Thirty clubs from across Northern England competed for the Championship, culminating in a final between St. Helens and Hunslet.

Season summary
St. Helens won their third Championship when they beat Hunslet 44-22 in the Championship Final. They had also finished the regular season as the league leaders.

The Challenge Cup winners were Wigan who beat Hull F.C. 30-13 in the final.

Wigan won the Lancashire League, and Wakefield Trinity won the Yorkshire League. Oldham beat St. Helens 12–2 to win the Lancashire County Cup, and Leeds beat Wakefield Trinity 24–20 to win the Yorkshire County Cup.

This season, St. Helens winger Tom van Vollenhoven set a new record for most tries in a season, with 62.

Championship

Play-offs

Challenge Cup

Wigan reached the final by beating Leeds 12–5 at home on 21 Feb in Round 1; Hunslet 22–4 at home on 7 Mar in Round 2; Halifax 26–0 away on 21 Mar in the quarter-finals and Swinton 5–0 on 11 Apr in the semi-final played at Leigh. Captained by Eric Ashton, they then beat Hull 30–13 in the Challenge Cup Final played at Wembley Stadium before a crowd of 79,811 with tries from Boston (2), Bolton, Holden, McTigue and Sullivan and six goals from Griffiths.

This was Wigan's sixth Challenge Cup Final win in ten Final appearances and their second in successive years. Brian McTigue, their second-row forward, was awarded the Lance Todd Trophy for his man-of-the-match performance.

References

Sources
1958-59 Rugby Football League season at Wigan.rlfans.com
The Challenge Cup at The Rugby Football League website

1958 in English rugby league
1959 in English rugby league
Northern Rugby Football League seasons